Danila Karaban (born July 26, 1996) is a Belarusian ice hockey player for HC Dinamo Minsk and the Belarusian national team.

He participated at the 2017 IIHF World Championship.

References

External links

1996 births
Living people
Belarusian ice hockey forwards
People from Navapolatsk
HC Dinamo Minsk players
Sportspeople from Vitebsk Region